The Timshor (also: Timsher) is a river in Perm Krai, Russia, a right tributary of the South Keltma. It starts in the northwestern part of Perm Krai, in Gaynsky District, near the border with the Komi Republic. It flows into the South Keltma  from the larger river's mouth. There are many swamps and lakes along the river.

Main tributaries:
 Left: Okos, Chepets;
 Right: My, Bortom.

References

Rivers of Perm Krai